Conrad Wilhelm Hase (2 October 1818, Einbeck28 March 1902, Hanover) was a German architect and Professor. He was a prominent representative of the Neo-Gothic style and is known for his preservation work.

Biography
He was one of ten children born to a tax collector. In 1834, he began his architectural studies in Hanover. After completing those studies in 1838, he was unable to find employment, so he returned home to assist his father. On the advice of one of his teachers, Ernst Ebeling, he began an apprenticeship as a bricklayer with the builder, Christoph August Gersting. He passed his journeyman's examination in 1840. He then went to observe various style of architecture on a six-month tour throughout Germany. A scholarship from the city of Einbeck enabled him to complete his studies at the Academy of Fine Arts, Munich.

In 1842, he returned to Hanover and took a position with Gersting's company. By 1843, he was able to obtain a position as construction manager for the Royal Hanoverian State Railways, where he designed and directed the work on several railway stations. In 1848, he began restoration work on the church at Loccum Abbey and found his true calling. His students there included Edwin Oppler, Heinrich Gerber, Wilhelm Walter, Georg Kegel and Richard Kampf.

He married Agnes Maria Cornelia Leguinia Babnigg (1828–1865), a Hungarian singer, in 1853. They had three children. Two years after her death, he remarried; to Ottilie Franziska Annette Amalie Berckelmann (1832–1920) from  Liebenburg.

He planned and designed more than 340 buildings; at least 100 of which were sacred in nature. He also participated in over 150 restoration projects. Among the awards he received were the Order of the Crown (1879), the Saxe-Ernestine House Order (1892), and the Order of the Red Eagle (1894).

His eightieth birthday was the occasion for numerous celebrations and honors. He died at his family's home, at the age of eighty-three. He was an honorary citizen of Hildesheim, and a street there is named after him.

Notable Works

References

Further reading 
 
 Conrad Wilhelm Hase. Baumeister des Historismus, Exhibition catalog, Historisches Museum am Hohen Ufer, Hanover 1968
 Günther Kokkelink: "Der Kirchenbau des Conrad Wilhelm Hase und seiner Schüler in Hannover". In: Geschichten um Hannovers Kirchen. Studien, Bilder, Dokumente. Lutherhaus-Verlag, Hannover 1983; pp.113–117.
 Nadine Pflüger, Werner Beermann: "Der Architekt Conrad Wilhelm Hase und seine Bauten aus früher Zeit. Die Bahnhöfe Elze und Bahnhof Nordstemmen". Vol. 7 of the Schriftenreihe des Heimat- und Geschichtsvereins Elze und seiner Ortsteile e. V., Elze 2007.
 Markus Jager, Thorsten Albrecht, Jan Willem Huntebrinker (Eds.): Conrad Wilhelm Hase (1818–1902): Architekt, Hochschullehrer, Konsistorialbaumeister, Denkmalpfleger, Imhof Verlag, 2019

External links 

 
 Conrad Wilhelm Hase, Plan Collection @ Kulturerbe Niedersachsen

1818 births
1902 deaths
People from Einbeck
19th-century German architects
Academic staff of the University of Hanover